American actor Dwayne Johnson, also known by his wrestling ring name "The Rock", has a long career in media, appearing in films, television series and video games.

Johnson had his first acting roles in Beyond the Mat (1999) and The Mummy Returns (2001), and played his first lead role in the spin-off The Scorpion King (2002). He has since starred in numerous other successful films, including The Rundown (2003), Walking Tall (2004), Southland Tales (2007), The Game Plan (2007), Get Smart (2008), Race to Witch Mountain (2009), Tooth Fairy (2010), Journey 2: The Mysterious Island (2012), G.I. Joe: Retaliation (2013), Pain & Gain (2013), Hercules (2014), San Andreas (2015), Central Intelligence (2016), Moana (2016), Rampage (2018), Skyscraper (2018), and Jungle Cruise (2021). Johnson's most successful box office role has been Luke Hobbs in The Fast and the Furious franchise. He first appeared as the character in Fast Five (2011) and helped catapult the film series into one of the top-grossing movie franchises in history. He starred in the sequels, Fast & Furious 6 (2013), Furious 7 (2015), and The Fate of the Furious (2017). The character's popularity led to The Fast and the Furious spin-off film Hobbs & Shaw (2019). Another notable franchise starring Johnson is the Jumanji franchise, as he has starred in the successful films, Jumanji: Welcome to the Jungle (2017), and its sequel, Jumanji: The Next Level (2019).

Johnson also starred in the HBO series Ballers starting in 2015. The show ran for five seasons and was ranked as HBO's most watched comedy in six years. Most recently Dwayne Johnson has appeared in the popular videogame Fortnite Battle Royale in which he voiced the character known as The Foundation, and again on October 21, 2022, as Black Adam.

The filmography does not include his professional wrestling appearances in any form of media or featured televised productions.

Film

Television

Video games

Music videos

References

External links

 

Male actor filmographies
American filmographies
Canadian filmographies